Hamza Akbar (Urdu:حمزه اكبر ; born 12 November 1993) is a Pakistani professional snooker player who won the 31st Asian Snooker Championship held in Kuala Lumpur, Malaysia in 2015. He is also the Pakistan national champion 2015.

Career
Born in Faisalabad city of Pakistan, Akbar is a two-time national snooker champion. Akbar won his first major international title at the age 22, beating Pankaj Advani of India 7–6 in the final in of Asian Snooker Championship in Kuala Lumpur, Malaysia in April 2015 to become the third player from Pakistan in 16 years to do so. The title earned him a two-year card for the main snooker tour beginning with the 2015–16 season.

He threatened a comeback from 4–0 against two-time world champion Mark Williams in the first round of the 2015 UK Championship, but lost 6–4. He took Michael Holt to a deciding frame in the opening round of the Welsh Open and made a break of 52, but was beaten 4–3. His most remarkable performance in his first season on the main tour came at the World Snooker Championship where he defeated world number 33 Jamie Jones 10–5 in the first qualifying round, before losing 10–3 to Ian Burns.

Akbar qualified for the 2016 Indian Open by overcoming Chris Wakelin 4–1, but withdrew from the event before it began. He received a bye through to the second round of the Northern Ireland Open and lost 4–2 to Josh Boileau. Akbar would have dropped off the tour at the end of the season due to being ranked world number 112, well outside the top 64 who remain, but he received special dispensation and received a new two-year tour card due to his visa problems which have forced him to miss many events in the past.

He practices at Oldham Snooker Academy.

Performance and rankings timeline

Career finals

Amateur finals: 4 (3 titles)

References

External links 
Hamza Akbar at worldsnooker.com
Pakistani snooker champion hasn't been paid - BBC Sport

Living people
Sportspeople from Faisalabad
1993 births
Snooker players from Punjab, Pakistan
Pakistani snooker players